Marquesa is a title of nobility.

Marquesa may also refer to:
 Marquesas Islands, a group of islands in French Polynesia
 Marquesan language, the language of the Marquesas Islands 
 Marquesas Keys, a group of uninhabited islands near Florida
 Survivor: Marquesas, the fourth season of the television series Survivor
 Rambler Marquesa, a show car by American Motors Corporation